FabricLive.79 is a 2015 DJ mix album by Jimmy Edgar. The album was released as part of the FabricLive Mix Series.

Track listing

References

External links

FabricLive.79 at Fabric

Fabric (club) albums
2015 compilation albums